Girls Like That may refer to:

 Girls Like That (song), a song by Deep Purple
 Girls Like That (play), a play by Evan Placey

See also
 "Girls Like That (Don't Go For Guys Like Us)", a song by Custard